Kodomonokuni Station is the name of three train stations in Japan:

 Kodomonokuni Station (Aichi) (こどもの国駅)
 Kodomonokuni Station (Kanagawa) (こどもの国駅)
 Kodomonokuni Station (Miyazaki) (子供の国駅)